
Below is a list of hits that topped the Ultratop 50 in 2012.

Ranking of most weeks at number 1

Ranking of most weeks at number 1

See also 
2012 in music

References 

Ultratop 50
Belgium
2012